"Come With Me" is a collaborative song by British record artist Dappy, upcoming MC Margs and music producers David Dawood and Nathan Retro, known for producing the Roll Deep hit song "Good Times". The song was written by all four artists in different global locations, between December 2011 and May 2012. "Come With Me" was originally to be released as the third official single from Dappy's debut solo studio album, Bad Intentions on 12 August 2012 as a digital download via the iTunes Store, however the single was removed from iTunes for unknown reasons. The song received its premiere when Dappy performed the song live at the Radio 1's Big Weekend in London on 23 June 2012.

Writing and production
"Come With Me" was written by singer-songwriter and rapper Costadinos Contostavlos (Dappy), and co-produced by record producers David Dawood (Dawood) and Nathan Retro (Retro). According to Dawood and Retro, the vocals for the song were recorded in China, Russia and Italy over a six-month period, prior to the single's release on 12 August 2012. They also stated that the track was initially intended as a left-over track for use in the future. They said:

"Come With Me" marks Dappy's fourth single away from N-Dubz, and follows his collaboration with Brian May on "Rockstar", which peaked at #2 in February 2012.

Music video
The music video to accompany the release of "Come With Me" commenced filming in July 2012. A snippet of the video premièred on 27 July 2012 on T4 Music, however after the single release was cancelled the video was never released.

Track listing

Credits and personnel 
Recording
Recorded in Beijing, China; Moscow, Russia; Milan, Italy

Personnel

 Lead vocals – Costadinos Contostavlos
 Producers – David Dawood and Nathan Retro
 Lyrics – Costadinos Contostavlos
 Sound designer – Nathan Retro
 Audio Engineer – David Dawood
 Composer – Costadinos Contostavlos
 Mixing Engineer – Nathan Retro
 Mastering Engineer – Nathan Retro
 Re-recording mixer – Nathan Retro
 Label: Takeover Entertainment Limited

References

2012 singles
Takeover Entertainment singles
Dappy songs
Songs written by Dappy
Song recordings produced by David Dawood
Song recordings produced by Nathan Retro
2012 songs
Songs written by David Dawood